Symphony No. 2 in B-flat major, Op. 15, was composed by Johan Svendsen in 1874.

The symphony has been characterized by Svendsen's biographers – Finn Benestaf and Dag Schjelderup-Ebbe – as Svendsen's "most mature and distinguished work".

Structure
There are four movements:
Allegro
Andante sostenuto
Intermezzo: Allegro giusto
''Finale: Andante – Allegro con fuoco.

Performance history 
The symphony was premiered in Oslo on 14 October 1876. The music was well received, and the third movement repeated for an enthusiastic audience.

Notes

References

External links 
 

1874 compositions
Compositions in B-flat major